3'-Aminoacetanilide is a chemical compound which is a amino derivative of acetanilide and meta-isomer of aminoacetanilide.  There are two other isomers of aminoacetanilide, 2-aminoacetanilide and 4-aminoacetanilide. Aminoacetanilide derivatives are important synthetic intermediates in heterocyclic and aromatic synthesis. These derivatives have found applications in pharmaceutical industry and dyes and pigment industry.

Synthesis 

A number of methods are available to synthesize 3'-aminoacetanilide. It could be prepared by reduction of m-nitroacetanilide. m-Chloroacetanilde has been converted into m-aminoacetanilide.

Uses 

3′-Aminoacetanilide has been used in the preparation of azo compounds, pyrrole, imidazole, thiazole and other heterocycles. It is starting material for Trametinib. It is also used to prepare reactive yellow K-RN and dispersed dye.

References 

Acetanilides
Anilines